Gummibärchen küßt man nicht (English title – Real Men Don't Eat Gummy Bears) is a 1989 West German comedy film. Despite featuring mainly American actors, the film was never released outside of Germany.

Cast
Christopher Mitchum as Johannes Thalberg/Josef Thalberg
Draco Rosa as Peter
John Hillerman as Padre
Angela Alvarado as Angela
Bentley Mitchum as Tony
Ernest Borgnine as The Bishop
Art Metrano as Secret Agent 712
 as Secret Agent KX 3
John van Dreelen as Geyer
Arthur Brauss as Colonel
Amadeus August as Spy
Käte Jaenicke as Gundula

Production
Gummibärchen küßt man nicht was filmed from March 12 to April 20 in Gran Canaria. The film was released on August 17, 1989, in German cinemas and in March 1990 on video. On November 4, 1991, the film was shown for the first time on German television channel RTL and was released with two other films in the series of German cult classic on DVD in 2008.

Soundtrack
Real Men Don't Eat Gummibears – 3:35 (Hong Kong Syndikat)
Angela – 4:54 (Robby Rosa)
A Cry In The Night - 3:24 (Lory Bonnie Bianco)
What Is Love - 3:35 (Eric & Hilda)
Rise Into - 4:08 (Private Property)
Kalmbach's Peace Of Mind - 3:34 (Midnight Cop)
Whose Gonna Love You Tonight - 3:52 (Nino de Angelo)
Little Woman - 3:35 (Robby Rosa)
Tell Me Why - 4:05 (Tony Baez)
Love Is Gonna Last Forever - 3:50 (Scott & Louise Dorsey)
Rumble Rag - 3:00 (Midnight Cop)
Bring Me Edelweiss - 3:43 (Edelweiss)

References

External links

1989 films
1980s crime comedy films
German crime comedy films
West German films
Films shot in the Canary Islands
1989 comedy films
1980s German-language films
English-language German films
1980s English-language films
1989 multilingual films
German multilingual films
1980s German films